Rinus Vreugdenhil (born 1951)  is the bass player and longest standing member of the Dutch heavy metal band Picture.

Rinus started out in the band Lemming as the bass player and sound mixer. He chose bass because he liked the low sound. In 1977, he met up with Laurens Bakker and with various musicians, started Picture. By 1979, Jan Bechtum and Ronald van Prooijen had joined the band for their first stable (and the classic) lineup. Throughout various lineup changes, he carried the torch and kept Picture going until the final breakup. He felt there was still some life left in the band but with so many personnel changes and the changing music scene, he had to let it go.

Rinus' influences included Pink Floyd, Jimi Hendrix, Deep Purple, and Frank Zappa. He used a Gibson Firebird bass and Sound City, Dynacord and later on, Peavey amps.

Recently (late 2007), Rinus and the original members of Picture, with Ronald van Prooijen, teamed up for a reunion rehearsal. It went so well that they decided to continue rehearsing for some concert dates, and considered recording a new album in early 2008 with Shmoulik Avigal from the Diamond Dreamer lineup as their singer.

As of mid-2008, a permanent lineup was established with Rinus, Jan Bechtum, Laurens Bakker, Rob vanEnkhuizen, and Pete Lovell. They are currently playing throughout Europe to very enthusiastic crowds. A limited edition live album was recorded at various venues and was released by the band. Plans are to go into the studio in early 2009 to record a new CD with new songs, two of which appeared on the limited edition CD.

External links 
 Official website Picture
 Biography van Picture in Dutch on popinstituut.nl
 Picture Yahoo Group

References
 

1951 births
Living people
Dutch bass guitarists